Eucharitolus lituratus is a species of longhorn beetles of the subfamily Lamiinae. It was described by Melzer in 1934, and is known from southeastern Brazil.

References

Beetles described in 1934
Endemic fauna of Brazil
Acanthocinini